The Olympus PEN E-PM2 is a digital rangefinder-style mirrorless interchangeable lens camera in the Micro Four Thirds system. It was announced by Olympus Corporation on September 17, 2012. It succeeds the Olympus PEN E-PM1.

References
http://www.dpreview.com/products/olympus/slrs/oly_epm2/specifications

Live-preview digital cameras
PEN E-PM2
Cameras introduced in 2012